Eomantis is a genus of praying mantis in the subfamily Tropidomantinae and tribe Tropidomantini, with species recorded from Asia.

Species
The species in this restored genus were previously placed as a subgenus of Tropidomantis.  The Mantodea Species File lists:
 Eomantis guttatipennis Stal, 1877 – type species
 Eomantis iridipennis Westwood, 1889
 Eomantis yunnanensis Wang, 1993

References

External links

Mantodea genera
Nanomantidae
Insects of Southeast Asia